The Associação de Futebol de Bragança (Bragança Football Association) is one of the 22 District Football Associations that are affiliated to the Portuguese Football Federation. The AF Bragança administers lower tier football in the district of Bragança.

Background 
Associação de Futebol de Bragança, commonly referred to as AF Bragança, is the governing body for football in the district of Bragança. The Football Association is based in Bragança. The Association's President is Eduardo Humberto Pires Ane.

The organisation was founded on 30 September 1930 and was affiliated to the Portuguese Football Federation on 24 January 1931. Sport Clube de Mirandela represented the district of Bragança in the national championships in those early years. From 1945 until 1953 there is no evidence that AF Bragança was operating and leading clubs affiliated to AF Vila Real.

Competitions
In 2013-14 3 Bragança clubs compete in the national levels of the Portuguese football league system in Campeonato Nacional de Seniores (the third level of the Portuguese football league system), a competition run by the Portuguese Football Federation.

Below the Campeonato Nacional de Seniores (Portuguese third level) the competitions are organised at a district level (known in Portuguese as Distritais) with each District Association organising its competitions according to geographical and other factors. The AF Bragança runs one league competition known as  the Division of Honour (Honra) at the fourth level of the league system and a cup competition known as Taça AF Bragança.  At one time there were two divisions in the league, known as Honra and 1ª divisão but this format was dropped in 2005/06.

In more general terms the AF Bragança currently organises District Championships for football and Futsal for men and women for all age groups including Senior, Junior, Youth, Beginners, Infants and Schools.

Notable clubs affiliated to AF Bragança
GD Bragança
SC Mirandela
CA Macedo de Cavaleiros

Current Divisions - 2013–14 season
The AF Bragança runs the following division covering the fourth tier of the Portuguese football league system.

Honra
Águia Futebol Clube de Vimioso
Associação Desportiva e Cultural de Rebordelo
Associação Estudantes Africanos de Bragança
Associação Recreativa Alfandeguense
Centro Cultural e Desportivo Minas de Argozelo
Futebol Clube de Vinhais
Grupo Desportivo de Bragança B
Grupo Desportivo de Poiares
Grupo Desportivo de Sendim
Grupo Desportivo de Torre de Moncorvo
Grupo Desportivo e Cultural de Santa Comba da Vilariça
Grupo Desportivo Mirandês
Sport Clube Mirandela B
Vila Flor Sport Clube

Former participants
Other clubs that have competed in the Distritais since the 1992/93 season include:

Associação Cultural Desportiva e Recreativa Bela Vista
Associação Desportiva de Coelhoso
Associação Desportiva e Cultural de Freixo de Espada à Cinta
Associação Desportiva e Recreativa de Morais
Associação Recreativa Social União de São Pedro dos Serracenos
Centro Cultural e Recreativo de Lamas
Clube Atlético de Macedo de Cavaleiros
Clube Desportivo e Cultural de Carção
Clube Desportivo Izeda
Futebol Clube de Carrazeda de Ansiães
Futebol Clube Mãe de Água
Futebol Clube Mogadourense
Grupo Desportivo de Milhão
Grupo Desportivo e Cultural de Santa Comba da Vilariça
Grupo Desportivo e Recreativo de Talhas
Grupo Desportivo e Recreativo de Vilas Boas
Grupo Desportivo Parada
Grupo Desportivo Torre de Moncorvo
Grupo Desportivo Torre Dona Chama
Grupo Recreativo Santulhão
Morais Futebol Clube
Sport Clube Mirandela

District championships

Champions

List of member clubs

Footnote
 1-10 games in Portuguese Cup.     *
 11-100 games in Portuguese Cup.  * *
 101+ games in Portuguese Cup.     * * *

See also
 Portuguese District Football Associations
 Portuguese football competitions
 List of football clubs in Portugal

References 

Portuguese District Football Associations

Sports organizations established in 1925